Tongrim station is a railway station in Tongrim-ŭp, Tongrim County, North P'yŏngan Province, North Korea. It is on located on the P'yŏngŭi Line of the Korean State Railway. It is also the starting point of the Ch'ŏlsan Line.

History
The station was opened, along with the rest of this section of the Kyŏngŭi Line, on 5 November 1905; it was originally called Ch'aryŏn'gwan station, receiving its current name in July 1945.

References

Railway stations in North Korea